The Oath of Stephan Huller (German: Der Eid des Stephan Huller) is a 1912 German silent drama film directed by Viggo Larsen and starring Larsen and Wanda Treumann. It is an adaptation of the 1912 novel of the same title by Felix Hollaender.

Cast
 Viggo Larsen as Boss Huller 
 Wanda Treumann as Bertha-Marie 
 Fritz Schroeter as Artinelli

References

Bibliography
 Halle, Randall & McCarthy, Margaret. Light Motives: German Popular Film in Perspective. Wayne State University Press, 2003.

External links

1912 films
Films of the German Empire
German silent feature films
Films directed by Viggo Larsen
German drama films
1912 drama films
German black-and-white films
Circus films
Silent drama films
1910s German films